was a bimonthly manga magazine by Ohta Publishing. It was first published as a monthly magazine on January 1, 2001, and switched to bimonthly in May 2002, releasing on the seventh of odd months. It ceased publication on July 8, 2014, with volume 88.

The manga magazine was created as a merger of two former magazines by Ohta Publishing, the monthly Manga Erotics and the seasonal Manga F. Manga artist Naoki Yamamoto had a supervisory role in the publication of the magazine, to which he also contributed some works. Unlike what its title may suggest, works lacking direct sexual expression were also included. The magazine was considered "underground" and published "artsy sex comics," according to Jason Thompson.

Contributors and titles
 
 
 
 
 
  (2002)
  (2005–2006)
  (2008–2011)
 
 
 
 
 
 Velveteen & Mandala
 
 Utsubora - A Story of a Novelist

References

External links
Manga Erotics F official homepage

2001 establishments in Japan
2014 disestablishments in Japan
Bi-monthly manga magazines published in Japan
Defunct magazines published in Japan
Magazines established in 2001
Magazines disestablished in 2014
Magazines published in Tokyo